Going Solo is a book by Roald Dahl, first published by Jonathan Cape in London in 1986. It is a continuation of his autobiography describing his childhood, Boy and detailed his travel to Africa and exploits as a World War II pilot.

Plot 
The book started with Dahl's voyage to Africa in 1938, which was prompted by his desire to find adventure after finishing school. He was on a boat heading towards Dar es Salaam for his new job working for Shell Oil. During this journey, he met various people and described extraordinary events such as a lion carrying a woman in its mouth.

He eventually joined the war as a squadron pilot in the Royal Air Force, flying the Tiger Moth, Gloster Gladiator, and Hawker Hurricane.  He was among the last Allied pilots to withdraw from Greece during the German invasion, taking part in the air for the Battle of Athens on 20 April 1941. In one of his accounts, he described a crash in the Western Desert, which fractured his skull and brought him several other problems such as temporarily being blinded during his days in Greece. After the country fell to the Nazis, he went to the Middle East to fight Vichy French pilots after staying for a brief time in Alexandria, Egypt.

Analysis 

In Storyteller: The Authorized Biography of Roald Dahl (2010), Donald Sturrock claimed that there are disparities to the author's claims in the book, describing them as flights of pure fancy or compelling recreations of stories heard from others such as the accounts about exotic African animal adventures. There was also the case of his encounter with a group of Germans, which he had orders to round up. Dahl wrote in Going Solo that its leader was killed by an African guard after thrusting a Luger pistol in his chest. In Lucky Break (1977), a story published 10 years prior, the version of this story was less dramatic with the Germans quickly giving themselves up, allowing Dahl's group to march themselves to a camp in Dar es Salaam without much difficulty.

References

1986 non-fiction books
Military memoirs
Books by Roald Dahl
Jonathan Cape books
British autobiographies